The 2014 Australian Open described in detail, in the form of day-by-day summaries.

Day 1 (January 13)
 Damir Džumhur became the first Bosnia and Herzegovina male to compete in any Grand Slam tournament. He won his opening round match over Jan Hájek.
 Day 1 attendance: 63,595
 Seeds out:
 Men's Singles:  Tommy Haas [12]
 Women's Singles:  Petra Kvitová [6],  Sara Errani [7],  Roberta Vinci [12],  Elena Vesnina [23]
 Schedule of Play

Day 2 (January 14)
On court temperatures hit , causing players and ballboys to collapse. Frank Dancevic describes the conditions as "inhumane".
 Day 2 attendance: 53,627
 Seeds out:
 Men's Singles:  John Isner [13]
 Women's Singles:  Svetlana Kuznetsova [19],  Sorana Cîrstea [21],  Kaia Kanepi [24]
 Schedule of Play

Day 3 (January 15)
Patrick Rafter played his first match in more than ten years when he partnered with Lleyton Hewitt in the opening round of doubles competition. The duo lost to Eric Butorac and Raven Klaasen 6–4, 7–5.
 Day 3 attendance: 49,860
 Seeds out:
 Men's Singles:  Mikhail Youzhny [14],  Ernests Gulbis [23],  Dmitry Tursunov [30],  Ivan Dodig [32]
 Women's Singles:  Sabine Lisicki [15],  Kirsten Flipkens [18]
 Men's Doubles:  Santiago González /  Scott Lipsky [16]
 Schedule of Play

Day 4 (January 16)
 Day 4 attendance: 53,226
 Seeds out:
 Men's Singles:  Juan Martín del Potro [5],  Andreas Seppi [24],  Fernando Verdasco [31]
 Women's Singles:  Magdaléna Rybáriková [32],  Bojana Jovanovski [33]
 Women's Doubles:  Marina Erakovic /  Zheng Jie [10]
 Schedule of Play

Day 5 (January 17)
By winning her third round encounter against Daniela Hantuchová, Serena Williams broke Margaret Court's record of 60 match victories at the Australian Open. Chinese Li Na saved 1 match point at 1-6, 5-6, 30-40 during the match against Lucie Šafářová. 
 Day 5 attendance:57,174
 Seeds out:
 Men's Singles:  Richard Gasquet [9],  Jerzy Janowicz [20],  Vasek Pospisil [28],  Jérémy Chardy [29]
 Women's Singles:  Samantha Stosur [17],  Lucie Šafářová [26],  Daniela Hantuchová [31]
 Men's Doubles:  Marcel Granollers /  Marc López [6],  Jean-Julien Rojer /  Horia Tecău [10]
 Women's Doubles:  Hsieh Su-wei /  Peng Shuai [2],  Alla Kudryavtseva /  Anastasia Rodionova [9],  Vania King /  Galina Voskoboeva [16]
 Schedule of Play

Day 6 (January 18)
 Day 6 attendance:80,219
 Seeds out:
 Men's Singles:  Milos Raonic [11],  Gilles Simon [18],  Gaël Monfils [25],  Feliciano López [26],  Benoît Paire [27]
 Women's Singles:  Caroline Wozniacki [10]  Carla Suárez Navarro [16],  Alizé Cornet [25],  Anastasia Pavlyuchenkova [29]
 Men's Doubles:  David Marrero /  Fernando Verdasco [3],  Jamie Murray /  John Peers [15]
 Women's Doubles:  Ashleigh Barty /  Casey Dellacqua [5],  Anna-Lena Grönefeld /  Mirjana Lučić-Baroni [11],  Kristina Mladenovic /  Flavia Pennetta [12],  Julia Görges /  Barbora Záhlavová-Strýcová [14]
 Schedule of Play

Day 7 (January 19)
Former world number one and 2008 French Open champion Ana Ivanovic caused the biggest upset of the tournament thus far, coming from a set down to defeat world number one, five-time Australian Open champion and 17-time Grand Slam champion Serena Williams for the first time in five attempts. Her victory not only ended Williams' 25-match winning streak, which had dated back to Cincinnati last year, but also earned worldwide recognition and was one of the most discussed matches on social media, beating the record previously set during the 2012 Australian Open men's final. It was later revealed that Williams had played through the match with a back injury, which affected her performance in this match.

Elsewhere, 6-time Australian Open champions, the Bryan Brothers made their earliest exit at the Australian Open in 11 years after they were defeated by the unseeded duo of Eric Butorac and Raven Klaasen. The match lasted only 78 minutes, as Butorac and Klaasen won 7–6 (9), 6–4. Eugenie Bouchard became the first Canadian woman to reach a Grand Slam quarterfinal since Patricia Hy-Boulais did so at the 1992 US Open.
 Day 7 attendance: ?
 Seeds out:
 Men's Singles:  Fabio Fognini [15],  Tommy Robredo [17],  Kevin Anderson [19]
 Women's Singles:  Serena Williams [1],  Angelique Kerber [9],  Ekaterina Makarova [22]
 Men's Doubles:  Alexander Peya /  Bruno Soares [2],  Rohan Bopanna /  Aisam-ul-Haq Qureshi [7]
 Women's Doubles:  Chan Hao-ching /  Liezel Huber [13]
 Mixed Doubles:  Liezel Huber /  Marcelo Melo [3]
 Schedule of Play

Day 8 (January 20)
New ground was broken on Day 8 as Simona Halep reached the quarterfinals of Grand Slam for the first time in her career by defeating Jelena Janković in three sets, while Grigor Dimitrov became the first Bulgarian man to reach the quarterfinals of a Grand Slam tournament.
 Day 8 attendance: 48,491
 Seeds out:
 Men's Singles:  Jo-Wilfried Tsonga [10],  Kei Nishikori [16]
 Women's Singles:  Maria Sharapova [3],  Jelena Janković [8],  Sloane Stephens [13]
 Men's Doubles:  Bob Bryan /  Mike Bryan [1],  Ivan Dodig /  Marcelo Melo [4],  Mariusz Fyrstenberg /  Marcin Matkowski [9],  Julien Benneteau /  Édouard Roger-Vasselin [11]
 Women's Doubles:  Daniela Hantuchová /  Lisa Raymond [15]
 Mixed Doubles:  Květa Peschke /  Marcin Matkowski [7],  Elena Vesnina /  Mahesh Bhupathi [8]
 Schedule of Play

Day 9 (January 21)
Eugenie Bouchard defeated Ana Ivanovic to become only the second Canadian to ever reach the semifinals of a Grand Slam in the open era, after Carling Bassett.

Another Serbian, Novak Djokovic, lost a five-set thriller to Stanislas Wawrinka, ending his 25 match winning streak at the event and 28 match winning streak overall. The defeat also ensured that there would be a new Australian Open finalist in the bottom half, as neither player from the opposing quarter-final (David Ferrer and Tomáš Berdych) had reached the final before. Berdych beat Ferrer in four sets to reach his first Australian Open semi-final and became the latest player to have reached at least the semi-finals of all four majors.
 Day 9 attendance:
 Seeds out:
 Men's Singles:  Novak Djokovic [2],  David Ferrer [3]
 Women's Singles:  Ana Ivanovic [14],  Flavia Pennetta [28]
 Men's Doubles:  Treat Huey /  Dominic Inglot [12]
 Women's Doubles:  Cara Black /  Sania Mirza [6],  Andrea Hlaváčková /  Lucie Šafářová [7]
 Mixed Doubles:  Anna-Lena Grönefeld /  Alexander Peya [1],  Andrea Hlaváčková /  Max Mirnyi [4]
 Schedule of Play

Day 10 (January 22)
Roger Federer became the first man to reach 11 consecutive semifinals at the Australian Open following his four-set victory over Andy Murray in the quarterfinals. Victoria Azarenka lost to Agnieszka Radwańska, ending a seven match winning streak over Radwańska and an eighteen match winning streak at the event. By defeating Azarenka, Radwańska advanced to her third major semifinal, the first since the 2013 Wimbledon Championships.
 Day 10 attendance:
 Seeds out:
 Men's Singles:  Andy Murray [4],  Grigor Dimitrov [22]
 Women's Singles:  Victoria Azarenka [2],  Simona Halep [11]
 Men's Doubles:  Leander Paes /  Radek Štěpánek [5]
 Women's Doubles:  Květa Peschke /  Katarina Srebotnik [4],  Raquel Kops-Jones /  Abigail Spears [8]
 Mixed Doubles:  Katarina Srebotnik /  Rohan Bopanna [2],  Anabel Medina Garrigues /  Bruno Soares [5]
 Schedule of Play

Day 11 (January 23)
Li Na reached her third Australian Open final in four years by beating Eugenie Bouchard. Dominika Cibulková became the first Slovak to reach the Australian Open final following her win over Agnieszka Radwańska. Stanislas Wawrinka reached his first major final by beating Tomáš Berdych in four sets.
 Day 11 attendance:33,942
 Seeds out:
 Seeds out:
 Men's Singles:  Tomáš Berdych [7]
 Women's Singles:  Agnieszka Radwańska [5],  Eugenie Bouchard [30]
 Men's Doubles:  Daniel Nestor /  Nenad Zimonjić [8],  Michaël Llodra /  Nicolas Mahut [13]
 Schedule of Play

Day 12 (January 24)
Rafael Nadal beat Roger Federer in straight sets to reach his third Australian Open final and 19th Grand Slam final overall.
 Day 12 attendance:
 Seeds out:
 Men's Singles:  Roger Federer [6]
 Women's Doubles:  Ekaterina Makarova /  Elena Vesnina [3]
 Schedule of Play

Day 13 (January 25)
Li Na won her first Australian Open title against first-time major finalist Dominika Cibulková. Li broke serve in the first game of the match but was broken back at 3–2, only to break again at 5–5 and serve for the set. Cibulková saved set point and took it into a tiebreak, which Li won and completed the second set 6–0 for the victory. For Li, it was her second Grand Slam title.
 Day 13 attendance: 19,225
 Seeds out:
 Women's Singles:  Dominika Cibulková [20]

Day 14 (January 26)
Stanislas Wawrinka won the first two sets against Rafael Nadal in the final. In winning the first set, Wawrinka was down 0–40 while serving for it at 5–3, but Nadal was unable to return any of Wawrinka's next five serves, which proved to be Wawrinka's 34th consecutive successful hold of serve. In the second set, Wawrinka broke in the opening game and held his own serve to lead 2–0, before Nadal sustained a back injury and needed a medical timeout. Wawrinka comfortably won the set as commentators speculated that Nadal may have been considering forfeiting the match and was seen to be in tears during changeovers. Nadal continued and won the third set, despite facing 15–40 in the first game on his own serve and also facing 15–40 while serving for the set at 5–3, as Wawrinka appeared to be suffering from nerves. Wawrinka won the match in the fourth set by winning the last eight points without reply. Pete Sampras awarded Wawrinka the trophy. This was the first time since Sergi Bruguera's 1993 French Open win that the winner of a Grand Slam men's event beat both number one and two seeds to clinch the championship; Wawrinka also became the first player to beat both Djokovic and Nadal in the same grand slam.

For Wawrinka, it was his first career Grand Slam title. In twelve previous match versus Nadal, he had not won a single set. Wawrinka became the third Swiss player to win a Grand Slam after Martina Hingis (who won five singles titles) and Roger Federer (who has won 17 to date). It was also the first time Nadal had lost a major final to anyone other than Federer or Novak Djokovic.
 Day 14 attendance:
 Seeds out:
 Men's Singles:  Rafael Nadal [1]
 Mixed Doubles:  Sania Mirza /  Horia Tecău [6]
 Schedule of Play

References

Day-by-day summaries
Australian Open (tennis) by year – Day-by-day summaries